George North is a Welsh rugby union player.

George North may also refer to:

George North (diplomat) (fl. 1561–1581), English man of letters
George North (numismatist) (1707–1772), English cleric
George North, 3rd Earl of Guilford (1757–1802), British politician
George North (Tramountanas) (1822–1911), first settler of Greek origin in South Australia

See also
Prince George North, former electoral district in British Columbia, Canada